This is a list of mayors of Murten (Stadtammann von Murten, Syndic de Morat), Canton of Fribourg, Switzerland. 

Murten
 
Murten